Chesley can refer to:

Places
 Chesley, Ontario, Canada, a community
 Chesley, Aube, France, a commune
 12104 Chesley, an asteroid

Others
 Chesley (name)
 Chesley Awards for artistic achievement in science fiction and fantasy art